Arrojadoa dinae is a species of plant in the family Cactaceae. It is endemic to Brazil.  Its natural habitat is dry savanna. It is threatened by habitat loss.

The main threats are deforestation for Eucalyptus plantations used for charcoal production. Collection of
the plant and fires can impact on its reproductive capacity.

References

Cactoideae
Cacti of South America
Endemic flora of Brazil
Flora of Bahia
Near threatened flora of South America
Taxonomy articles created by Polbot